Then We Came to the End is the first novel by Joshua Ferris.  It was released by Little, Brown and Company on March 1, 2007. A satire of the American workplace, it is similar in tone to Don DeLillo's Americana, even borrowing DeLillo's first line for its title.

It takes place in a Chicago advertising agency that is experiencing a downturn at the end of the 1990s Internet boom. Ferris employs a first-person-plural narrative.

Critical reaction
The book was greeted with positive reviews from GQ, The New York Times,The New Yorker, Esquire, and Slate. The book was named one of the Best Books of 2007 by The New York Times.

Time magazine's Lev Grossman named it one of the Top 10 Fiction Books of 2007, ranking it at #2.

The book won the PEN/Hemingway Award for best first novel.

References

External links

2007 American novels
American comedy novels
Little, Brown and Company books
Novels set in Chicago
Workplace comedies
Hemingway Foundation/PEN Award-winning works
2007 debut novels